Urban Menace is a 1999 American horror film directed by Albert Pyun and starring Snoop Dogg, Big Pun, Ice-T and Fat Joe.

Premise
After a church burning in which a preacher and his family are killed, the preacher's insane ghost (Snoop Dogg) starts killing off the members of the gang responsible.

Cast
 Snoop Dogg as "Preacher" Caleb
 Big Pun as "Crow"
 Ice-T as The Narrator
 Fat Joe as "Terror"
 T. J. Storm as King
 Vincent Klyn as "Shadow"
 Romany Malco as "Syn"
 Tahitia Hicks as Holt (Tahitia)
 Eva La Dare as Jolene (Karen Dyer)
 Ernie Hudson Jr. as "No Dice"
 Jahi J.J. Zuri as "Cool D"
 Rob Ladesich as Harper
 Michael Walde-Berger as Harper's Boss
 Michaela Polakovicova as Hooker
 Ed Satterwhite as Crow's Posse
 Jason Stapleton as Crow's Posse
 Lubo Salater as Crow's Posse
 Robert Ughoro as Caleb's Posse

Production
Director Pyun shot Urban Menace simultaneously with The Wrecking Crew and Corrupt in a derelict factory in Eastern Europe, originally intending Urban Menace and The Wrecking Crew as sections of a single film; the producers decided to make two films. The budget only permitted two stuntmen, making deaths repetitive. Pyun often superimposed the stars' faces onto stand-ins. Half the finished film was lost in transit, requiring substitution of rough duplicate footage; large parts of Urban Menace are in black and white and the photography is often blurry.

Reception
The film was regarded as low-quality; the DVD provides an option of skipping it and simply listening to Ice-T rapping. However, one critic praises the hip-hop and rap soundtrack and crisp sound effects.

References

External links 
 
 

1999 films
Hood films
Snoop Dogg video albums
Films directed by Albert Pyun
1999 drama films
1990s English-language films
1990s American films